Baptist was an unincorporated community in Harrison County, Kentucky, United States.

History
A post office was established at Baptist in 1888, and remained in operation until 1906. The community probably took its name from the local Beaver Baptist Church.

References

Unincorporated communities in Harrison County, Kentucky
Unincorporated communities in Kentucky